The 1986–87 New Orleans Privateers men's basketball team represented the University of New Orleans during the 1986–87 NCAA Division I men's basketball season. The Privateers led by third-year head coach Benny Dees, played their home games at Lakefront Arena and played as an NCAA Independent for the last season before being a member of the American South Conference during the 1987–88 season. They finished the season 26–4 and earned a bid to the NCAA tournament as the No. 7 seed in the Southeast region. The Privateers beat BYU in the opening round and lost to No. 2 seed Alabama in the round of 32, 101–76.

Roster

Schedule and results

|-
!colspan=9 style=| Regular Season

|-
!colspan=9 style=| NCAA Tournament

Rankings

References

New Orleans Privateers men's basketball seasons
New Orleans
New Orleans
1986 in sports in Louisiana
1987 in sports in Louisiana